The Bat is a 1926 American silent comedy mystery film directed by Roland West and starring Jack Pickford and Louise Fazenda. The film is based on the 1920 Broadway hit play The Bat by Mary Roberts Rinehart and Avery Hopwood, which itself was an adaptation of Rinehart's 1908 mystery novel The Circular Staircase. The Bat has been cited as an early influence on the "slasher film" genre.

Plot
Gideon Bell, owner of the Favre Emeralds, receives a letter stating that the emeralds will be stolen at midnight by "the Bat", and that police will not be able to stop the robbery. The Bat, a figure dressed as a bat, murders Gideon and steals the emeralds. The Bat leaves a bat-shaped note for the chief of police to inform him that he will be traveling to the country. The Bat travels by car to a mansion built by Courtleigh Fleming, the president of the Oakdale Bank, who has recently been found dead in Colorado. The mansion is being rented for the summer by writer Cornelia Van Gorder, whose maid, Lizzie Allen, sets up a bear trap to catch the Bat. Richard Fleming, Courtleigh's spendthrift nephew, wishes to lease the mansion, and plans with Dr. H. E. Wells to frighten Van Gorder away.

The newspaper reports that Brooks Bailey, a cashier at Oakdale Bank, has robbed the bank of $200,000 and has disappeared. Van Gorder's niece, Miss Dale Ogden, arrives with a supposed new gardener. Van Gorder asks the gardener about his knowledge on alopecia, urticaria, and rubeola, and he answers as if the terms referred to plants rather than medical conditions. On the staircase, Richard is shot, and Miss Dale manages to snatch part of a blueprint of the house from his pocket. Detective Moletti accuses her of trying to find a supposed hidden room in the mansion that should be shown on the blueprint. Detective Anderson arrives, and the group gets a call from the house phone in the garage, which sounds like groans of distress. A circular light shines on the wall, with the shadow of a bat in its center, but after investigating, the group finds that the shape was caused by a miller moth on a car headlight.

Dr. Wells has Miss Dale recreate Richard's murder, and she notes that she tucked the blueprint in a Parker House roll on a tray, but the blueprint is now gone. The new gardener is revealed to be Brooks Bailey, and Anderson attempts to arrest him for robbery, murder, and impersonation, but Miss Dale stops him, revealing that she and Brooks are engaged. Dr. Wells searches for the hidden room by knocking on walls, which causes the others to investigate the sound, leading them to a ballroom which is supposedly haunted. The candles in the ballroom go out when lit, and a shape appears to float towards Anderson and Lizzie, but it turns out to be the Japanese butler Billy carrying a lamp. After being confronted by Moletti, Dr. Wells knocks Moletti unconscious by striking his head, and he hides Moletti's body in another room. A beaten man enters the house, and Anderson finds that he has no identification on his person.

Billy sees a mysterious figure wearing a hat, and as he leaves to tell the others, the Bat's shadow passes by the door. The Bat sets up a system of wires that attach to a light switch. Outside, Brooks sees the figure in the hat crossing the roof, and realizes that it is the supposedly dead Courtleigh Fleming. Miss Dale finds the hidden room, located behind a fireplace. The Bat confronts her, demanding the combination to the safe in the hidden room, but she escapes. Dr. Wells is accused of helping the Bat, and the Bat is soon captured and held at gunpoint. However, the Bat activates the wire system, turning off the lights and allowing himself to escape. The Bat flees outside but his leg is caught in the bear trap placed earlier by Lizzie. The others find him and remove his mask, revealing him to be Moletti. The beaten, unknown man announces that he is the true Detective Moletti, and that the man underneath the Bat's mask had stolen his papers, locked him in the garage, set it on fire and impersonated him.

Cast

Production
Director Roland West was reportedly a huge fan of Rinehart's stage play The Bat. So much so, that when initial negotiations to purchase the rights to the play fell through, he became inspired to instead direct an adaptation of another horror-themed stage play, called The Monster. On September 11, 1925, The Film Daily reported that Roland West had purchased the rights to the play for $75,000 with the intent to produce a film version.

On November 4, 1925, The Film Daily reported that Julien Josephson had completed the screenplay adaptation of The Bat. The Trade Review reported that Josephson allegedly had  "written the screen story of The Bat without changing the general plot, but has added mystery complications calculated to baffle even the hundreds of thousands who have seen the stage play,” with West going so far as to claim that "The picture will be a complete surprise even to those who have seen the stage play."

The prop department was directed by Ned Herbert Mann, who constructed the miniatures for the film: the buildings and "the Bat" in flight. The interior of the mansion was constructed at the United Artists' Hollywood sound stage under the direction of William Cameron Menzies. Scenic artist Harvey Meyers was enlisted to paint shadows on the sets to enhance the somber atmosphere of the more suspenseful, dark scenes that are later into the film. Cinematographer Arthur Edeson, assisted by then-newcomer Gregg Toland, was enlisted to shoot the film.

Around the time of filming, much of the film's production was shrouded in mystery, in accordance with the secrecy behind the identity of "the Bat" character, with many of those involved in the filming being obliged to take an oath to not reveal any details of the story publicly and with West disallowing visitors onto the set. West also made his cast work at night, stating that "Given the quiet of the studio at midnight, when no other companies are working, and plenty of spooky music from an orchestra, the players really are in a mood to simulate dark deeds."

Reception
Motion Picture World George T. Pardy called The Bat "a box-office knockout" and became one of West's best-received films. The New York Times dubbed the film as "both entertaining and exciting" and Photoplay dubbed the film as "It's thrilling. It's chilling. It's a scream of laughter and spookiness."

Legacy
The film was considered to be one of the "most coveted" lost films for decades, until a print was discovered in the 1980s and restored by film director and archivist Robert Gitt for the UCLA Film and Television Archive.

Remakes

Film remakes
Director Roland West remade his film four years later as The Bat Whispers (1930), with Chester Morris and Una Merkel, and also released by United Artists. 
A 1959 remake, The Bat, starring Vincent Price and Agnes Moorehead, was released by Allied Artists.

TV adaptations
 Broadway Television Theatre (1953) 60-minute made for TV version (WOR-TV, syndicated), with Estelle Winwood, Alice Pearce, and Jay Joslyn
 Dow Hour of Great Mysteries (1960) 60-minute NBC-TV version with Helen Hayes, Margaret Hamilton, and Jason Robards.
  (1978) 88-minute West German made-for-TV movie

Notes

References

External links

 
 The Bat (1926) at silentera.com
 
  (version with soundtrack)
 
 
 
 

1926 films
1920s comedy horror films
1920s English-language films
1926 mystery films
1920s thriller films
1920s comedy mystery films
American silent feature films
American black-and-white films
Films about writers
American films based on plays
American comedy mystery films
Films directed by Roland West
American comedy horror films
American haunted house films
Articles containing video clips
1920s rediscovered films
Films based on works by Mary Roberts Rinehart
1926 comedy films
Rediscovered American films
Films set in country houses
1920s American films
Silent comedy-drama films
Silent comedy mystery films
Silent thriller films
Silent horror films
Silent American drama films
Silent American comedy films